Glen Burke is an Irish Gaelic footballer who plays for Fethard and the Tipperary county team.

He also played for Donegal Boston.

References

Year of birth missing (living people)
Living people
Donegal Boston Gaelic footballers
Fethard Gaelic footballers
Tipperary inter-county Gaelic footballers